The Silver center cent is an American pattern coin produced by the United States Mint in 1792. As a precursor to the large cent it was one of the first coins of the United States and an early example of a bimetallic coin. Only 12 original examples are known to exist, of which one is located in the National Numismatic Collection at the Smithsonian Institution. Two more specimens (Morris and California) exist but contain fabricated plugs added after minting.

Origins
During the early years of the American republic, there was a general consensus that the intrinsic bullion value of the new nation's coinage should be approximately equal to its face value. Some merchants would refuse to accept coins that did not meet this standard. For most denominations, bullion parity was achieved by producing the coins in a gold or silver alloy. However, the Coinage Act of 1792 specified that the cent was to consist of 11 pennyweight (264 grains or 17.1 g) of pure copper. Such a weight, needed to maintain intrinsic value, would have been too heavy for practical everyday use.

U.S. Secretary of State Thomas Jefferson suggested an alternative: a coin made of an alloy that was primarily copper, but that included enough silver to give a reasonably-sized coin an intrinsic value of one cent.  This billon alloy was considered by the U.S. Mint, but U.S. Treasury Secretary Alexander Hamilton feared that it would be too susceptible to counterfeiting, since its appearance differed little from that of pure copper. In 1792, the Mint's chief coiner, Henry Voigt, hit upon a solution: a copper planchet, slightly smaller than that of a modern quarter, with a small silver "plug" inserted in a center hole during the striking process. The silver plug would have been worth approximately ¢ at contemporary bullion prices, while the copper planchet added an additional ¢ of intrinsic value. Several such coins were produced as test pieces. Ultimately, the additional labor required for these bimetallic coins proved unsuitable for mass production, and the large cent that was produced for circulation starting in 1793 consisted of 208 grains of 100% copper.

Design
The obverse of the silver center cent features a right-hand facing Liberty head with flowing unbound hair. The date appears below the portrait, and the words "LIBERTY PARENT OF SCIENCE & INDUST." are inscribed in a circular pattern around the central devices. The reverse design consists of a wreath with the words "ONE CENT" in the center, and the fraction "1/100" below. Surrounding the wreath, "UNITED STATES OF AMERICA" is inscribed.

Specimens

References

Bi-metallic coins
One-cent coins of the United States
Goddess of Liberty on coins